Isfahan Province, also transliterated as Esfahan, Espahan, Isfahan, or Isphahan, is one of the 31 provinces of Iran. The capital of the province is the city of Isfahan. It is located in the center of the country in Iran's Region 2, whose secretariat is located in Isfahan.

At the 2006 National Census, the province's population was 4,499,327 in 1,223,684 households, with a literacy rate of 88.65 percent. The following census in 2011 counted 4,879,312 people in 1,454,162 households. At the most recent census in 2016, the population of the province was 5,120,850 in 1,607,482 households.

Geography
The Isfahan province covers an area of approximately 107,018 square km and is situated in the center of Iran. To its north, stand the Markazi (Central) Province and the provinces of Qom and Semnan. To its south, it is bordered by the provinces of Fars,  and Kohgiluyeh and Boyer-Ahmad Province. Aminabad  is the most southern city of Isfahan province just 2 km north of the border. To the east, it is bordered by the province of Yazd. To the west, it is bordered by the province of Lurestan and to the southwest of the province of Chahar Mahal and Bakhtiyari.

The province experiences a moderate and dry climate on the whole, ranging between 40.6 °C (105.08 °F) and 10.6 °C (51 °F) on a cold day in the winter season. The average annual temperature has been recorded as 16.7 °C (62 °F) and the annual rainfall on average has been reported as 116.9 mm. The city of Sepahan (Esfahan) however experiences an excellent climate, with four distinct seasons.

With an elevation of 4,040 metres, the Shahankuh is the highest peak in Isfahan Province. This mountain is located about 20 kilometres southwest of the city of Fereydunshahr in the western part of Isfahan Province.

Isfahan province has 52 rivers, mostly small and temporary, with the exception of the Zāyanderud, which totals 405 km in length a basin area of 27,100 km2.

Biodiversity
Aphanius isfahanensis (Farsi: کپوردندان_اصفهان) is a species of Cyprinodontid fish endemic to the Zayandehrud river basin (see genus Aphanius). It is known only from three sites across the province.
Allium chlorotepalum is an endemic species of Isfahan province, Astragalus vernaculus is also common in the west of the province.

History
Historians have recorded Espahan, Sepahan or Isfahan initially as a defense and military base. The security and protection of the gradually increasing castles and fortifications, thereby, would provide the protection of residents nearby, therefore leading to the growth of large settlements nearby. These historical castles were Atashgah, Sarooyieh, Tabarok, Kohan Dej, and Gard Dej. The oldest of these is Ghal'eh Sefeed and the grounds at Tamijan from prehistoric times. The historic village of Abyaneh, a nationwide attraction, also has Sassanid ruins and fire temples among other historical relics.

During the 17th and 18th centuries, Isfahan province enjoyed high standards of prosperity as it became the capital of Safavid Persia. While the city of Sepahan (Esfahan) was their seat of monarchical, Kashan was their place of vacation and leisure.

Administrative disivions

Cities 

According to the 2016 census, 4,507,430 people (over 88% of the population of Isfahan province) live in the following cities: Abrisham 22,429, Abuzeydabad 5,976, Afus 3,696, Alavijeh 8,067, Anarak 1,903, Aran and Bidgol 65,404, Ardestan 15,744, Asgaran 4,858, Asgharabad 6,876, Badrud 14,723, [[[Bafran]] 1,978, [Bagh-e Bahadoran]] 10,279, Bagh-e Shad 4,356, Baharan Shahr 11,284, Baharestan 79,023, Barf Anbar 5,382, Barzok 4,588, Buin Miandasht 9,889, Chadegan 9,924, Chamgardan 15,574, Chermahin 13,732, Damaneh 4,366, Daran 20,078, Dastgerd 17,775, Dehaq 8,272, Dehaqan 17,945, Dizicheh 18,935, Dorcheh Piaz 47,800, Dowlatabad 40,945, Ezhiyeh 3,156, Falavarjan 37,704, Farrokhi 2,968, Fereydunshahr 13,603, Fuladshahr 88,426, Gaz 24,433, Goldasht 25,235, Golpayegan 58,936, Golshahr 9,904, Gorgab 9,690, Guged 6,012, Gulshan 5,437, Habibabad 9,491, Hana 4,922, Harand 7,829, Hasanabad 4,478, Imanshahr 14,633, Isfahan 1,961,260, Jandaq 4,665, Jowsheqan Qali 4,181, Jowzdan 6,998, Kamu va Chugan 2,434, Karkevand 7,058, Kahriz Sang 10,442, Kashan 304,487, Kelishad va Sudarjan 25,635, Khaledabad 3,023, Khansar 21,883, Khomeyni Shahr 247,128, Khur 6,765, Komeshcheh 5,100, Khvorzuq 29,154, Komeh 2,305, Kuhpayeh 5,518, Kushk 13,248, Lay Bid 1,832, Mahabad 3,727, Majlesi 9,363, Manzariyeh 7,164, Meshkat 5,357, Meymeh 5,651, Mobarakeh 69,449, Mohammadabad 5,032, Nain 27,379, Najafabad 235,281, Nasrabad 6,425, Natanz 14,122, Neyasar 2,319, Nikabad 4,364, Nushabad 11,838, Pir Bakran 13,469, Qahderijan 34,226, Qahjavarestan 9,712, Qamsar 3,877, Rezvanshahr 3,606, Rozveh 4,332, Sagzi 5,063, Sedeh Lenjan 19,101, Sefidshahr 5,804, Semirom 26,942, Shahin Shahr 173,329, Shapurabad 5,915, Shahreza 134,952, Sin 5,495, Talkhuncheh 9,924, Tarq Rud 1,749, Tiran 21,703, Tudeshk 4,275, Vanak 1,665, Varnamkhast 18,700, Varzaneh 12,714, Vazvan 5,952, Zarrin Shahr 55,817, Zavareh 8,320, Zayandeh Rud 9,463, Zazeran 7,962, Ziar 3,918, and Zibashahr 10,200.

Demographics 

Isfahan province encompasses various sects today. The majority of the people in the province are Persian speakers, but Bakhtiari Lurs, Kurds, Georgians, Armenians, Qashqais and Persian Jews also reside in the province. The official language of the province is Persian, though different ethnic groups and tribes speak languages of their own, including Judeo-Persian, Armenian, Georgian, Qashqai Turkic, Kurdish and Bakhtiari Lurish. Isfahan province is noted for the large number of cultural luminaries which it has produced, including poets, scholars, philosophers, theologians and scientists of national renown.

Language 

A majority of the population speak Persian as first language with a minority of Luri, Turkic, Georgian, Biyabanaki and Armenian speakers.

Economy
Nine tons of saffron are produced by this province by the year.

It's the biggest milk and dairy producer in Iran.

Cuisine 

According to the Isfahan atlas, well-known local dishes include , Kachi, Kebab Golpayegan, Samanu Shahreza,  Khansar , Yokhe bread (Kaak) and Semirom.

Education

Public universities
Isfahan University of Technology
Isfahan University
Isfahan University of Medical Sciences
Kashan University of Medical Sciences
Isfahan University of Art
Malek-Ashtar University of Technology
University of Kashan

Islamic Azad Universities
Several well-known Islamic Azad University campuses in Iran are located in the province:
Islamic Azad University of Falavarjan
Islamic Azad University of Meymeh
Islamic Azad University of Kashan
Islamic Azad University of Majlesi
Islamic Azad University of Shahreza
Islamic Azad University of Najafabad
Islamic Azad University of Khomeynishahr
Islamic Azad University of Isfahan
Islamic Azad University of Khorasgan

Gallery

See also
 Georgians in Iran
 History of Iran
 List of the historical structures in the Isfahan province
 List of cities in Isfahan Province by population
 Ostandari Isfahan

References

Bibliography

Further reading
 Muliani, S. (2001) The Georgians’ position in the Iranian history and civilization (Jaygah-e Gorjiha dar Tarikh va Farhang va Tammadon-e Iran) , Sepahan (Esfahan): Yekta
 Rahimi, M.M. (2001) The Georgians of Iran; Fereydunshahr (Gorjiha-ye Iran; Fereydunshahr), Sepahan (Esfahan): Yekta
 Sepiani, M. (1979) Georgian Iranians (Iranian-e Gorji), Sepahan (Esfahan): Arash
 Isfahan's tourist exhibition mentions the Georgians from Fereydunshahr and Fereydan. The report of this exhibition is available in the web site of the Iranian Cultural Heritage News agency. 
 Saakashvili visited Fereydunshahr and put flowers on the graves of the Iranian Georgian martyrs' graves, showing respect towards this community.

External links

 
 Isfahan Cultural Heritage Department 
 Isfahan Province Department of Education

 
Provinces of Iran